The ICL 20s World Series 2007/08 was the final tournament in the inaugural season of ICL. Unlike previous tournaments it featured 'international' sides rather than city-based teams. The tournament commenced on 9 April 2008 and the final match was held on 15 April 2008. The league consisted of three teams: ICL India, ICL Pakistan & ICL World. Each team playing each other twice.

Fixtures
All of the fixtures in the 2008 ICL World Series were played at Lal Bahadur Shastri Stadium, Basheer Bagh, Hyderabad. All the games also began at 19:00 IST on their respective date.

Fixtures

Standings

Knock-out

Man of the Series Ibrahim Khaleel (ICL India)

References

Indian Cricket League seasons